Malapoa College, originally British Secondary School (BSS), is an English-language secondary school in Port Vila, Vanuatu. Originally a school for dependents of employees of the pre-independence Vanuatu government and foreign expatriates, it opened in 1966.

 it had 755 students. A new school is scheduled to open in 2018. The new school had a cost of 1.2 billion Vanuatu vatus. Yanjian Group designed the school facilities, with China Northeast Architectural Design and Research Institute Co Ltd. (CSCECNEI) having additional input. The Chinese government funded the construction of the school.

Campus
The  facility has an administration area, an academic area, and a residential area. The administration building is at the main entrance.

The main academic area has three classroom buildings, two science buildings, a library building, and an employee building. The academic buildings have seven classrooms and the science buildings have eight laboratories for science classes. All of these buildings are two stories tall.

The residential area has two student dormitories, a residential facility for teachers, a canteen, and a recreation building for day students. The teacher residence building has two stories. Each student dormitory, one for boys and one for girls, may house up to 500 students and has three stories. The playground is in the residential section.

Notable alumni 

 Merilyn Tahi - women's rights activist.

References

Schools in Vanuatu
Port Vila
Boarding schools